Laura Marcela Costales Peñaherrera (October 24, 1951 - June 26, 2020) was an Ecuadorian historian and a politician. She was viceprefect of Pichincha between 2009 and 2019.

Biography 
In 2017 she developed the project "SOS Mujeres Pichincha" (SOS Pichincha Women) from her position in the viceprefecture.

She was vice prefect of the Provincia of Pichincha from 2009 until  2019, during the prefecture of Gustavo Baroja

Costales died on July 28, 2021 at the age of 68 due to consequences of a tumor.

Published works 
 Memorial de la ciudad de los espejos
 Mujeres patriotas y precursoras de la libertad : Bicenterario vive la independencia
 Rosa Campusano: biografía

Awards 
Doctorate Honoris Causa Universidad Del Pacífico - Escuela de Negocios

References 

 

1951 births
2020 deaths
PAIS Alliance politicians
Ecuadorian women writers
Ecuadorian essayists
Ecuadorian women in politics
Ecuadorian historians
21st-century Ecuadorian politicians
21st-century Ecuadorian women politicians
People from Quito